The Flottille de Boulogne was a large fleet of small gunboats, brigs and barges built in Boulogne on the orders of First Consul Napoléon Bonaparte from 1801. It was a key component of Napoleon's planned invasion of the United Kingdom.

Prelude 
At the Battle of Svensksund, the Swedes broke the naval stalemate with their Russian opponents and won a spectacular victory by engaging the Archipelago fleet, a flotilla of galleys, prams and gunboats. With the French Navy weakened by the Glorious First of June, a strategic victory with a crushing tactical cost, and incapable of challenging the Royal Navy head-on since the Croisière du Grand Hiver, the concept of a rush across the English Channel to invade England gained traction.

The plans of the ships designed by Chapman were transmitted to Forfait by JJ.Muskeyn in 1796.

On 10 October 1794, the Committee of Public Safety created a first draft of the flotilla. On 25 December 1797, the French Directory appointed General Napoléon Bonaparte to the head of the Armée d'Angleterre.

The flotilla 

In a decree of 12 July 1801, the flotilla was organised into nine divisions. It comprised several types of ship:
 Bateau canonnier, a small two-masted fore-and-aft rigged gunboat carrying  one large gun
 Chaloupe canonnière (or simply "canonnière"), a small brig
 Balancelle
 Prame, a flat-hulled barge

In the summer, the British under Horatio Nelson launched a series of raids on Boulogne, with a first attempt on 4 August, and another on 15–16. French admiral Latouche-Tréville organised a successful defence that derailed the attacks.

The Treaty of Amiens of 25 March 1802 suspended the activity of the flotilla, but it was reactivated at the outbreak of the War of the Third Coalition in May 1803. Bonaparte reorganised the flotilla, which was regularly attacked by British forces with little effect; against a background of constant harassing actions between small French and British ships, the flotilla achieved some limited victories against larger British units, such as the capture of HMS Minerve on 2 July 1803 off Cherbourg, or the action of 15 July 1805.

On 3 October 1804, a British force under Lord Keith attempted to destroy the flotilla using 25 fireships, which were repelled. The attempt was renewed on 9 October 1806 using Congreve rockets, and the next days by gunfire, with no effect.

Sources and references

Notes

References

Bibliography 
 

French military units and formations of the Napoleonic Wars
Napoleon's planned invasion of the United Kingdom
 
Armies of Napoleonic Wars